Freddie Lee Solomon, Jr. (born August 15, 1972) is a former professional American football player who played wide receiver for three seasons for the Philadelphia Eagles in the National Football League (NFL).  He continued his career in the Arena Football League from 2003 to 2007 with the Tampa Bay Storm and Columbus Destroyers, compiling 366 receptions, 4,880 yds, 95 TD.

References

1972 births
Living people
American football wide receivers
Columbus Destroyers players
Philadelphia Eagles players
South Carolina State Bulldogs football players
Tampa Bay Storm players
Players of American football from Gainesville, Florida